The 1936 Giro di Lombardia was the 32nd edition of the Giro di Lombardia cycle race and was held on 8 November 1936. The race started and finished in Milan. The race was won by Gino Bartali of the Legnano team.

General classification

References

1936
Giro di Lombardia
Giro di Lombardia